Lieutenant Commander Godfrey de Courcelles Chevalier, USN (7 March 1889 – 14 November 1922) was a pioneering naval aviator of the United States Navy of World War I and the early 1920s.

Biography
Born in Providence, Rhode Island on 7 March 1889, Chevalier graduated from the United States Naval Academy in June 1910. He was appointed a Naval Air Pilot on 7 November 1915 and a Naval Aviator on 7 November 1918.

On 8 May 1913, ensign Chevalier was the passenger in a long-distance flight of 169 miles, flown in a Curtiss flying boat piloted by Lieutenant John Henry Towers, Naval Aviator No. 3, from the Washington Navy Yard in Washington, D.C. down the Potomac River and then up the Chesapeake Bay to the U.S. Naval Academy at Annapolis, Maryland. The flight took three hours and five minutes. 

On 12 July 1916 he participated in the installation of the first real aircraft catapult used in the U.S. Navy and piloted the first plane to be launched by catapult, from the armored cruiser . In November 1917 he commanded the first naval air station in France, at Dunkerque, and for World War I service was awarded the Distinguished Service Medal. On 9 March 1919 he was also awarded the Croix de Guerre.

On 26 October 1922 Lieutenant Commander Chevalier made the first landing on Langleys deck, flying Aeromarine 39B No. 606. 

A distinguished pioneer of naval aviation, Chevalier died at the Norfolk Naval Hospital at Naval Station Norfolk in Norfolk, Virginia, on 14 November 1922 as a result of injuries sustained in the 12 November 1922 crash near Lockhaven, Virginia, of a Vought VE-7 he was flying from Naval Air Station Norfolk to Yorktown, Virginia.

Namesake
Two U.S. Navy destroyers have been named  in his honor, as was Chevalier Field, an airfield at Naval Air Station Pensacola in Pensacola, Florida. The Chevalier Theatre in Medford, Massachusetts is also named for him.

Awards & Decorations

Photo gallery

References

External links

www.history.navy.mil: USS Chevalier

1889 births
1922 deaths
People from Providence, Rhode Island
United States Naval Academy alumni
United States Navy officers
United States Naval Aviators
United States Navy personnel of World War I
Recipients of the Navy Distinguished Service Medal
Recipients of the Croix de Guerre (France)
Aviators killed in aviation accidents or incidents in the United States
Victims of aviation accidents or incidents in 1922